Aethodes is a monotypic moth genus of the family Noctuidae. Its only species, Aethodes angustipennis, is found in Nigeria and Ghana. Both the species and genus were first described by George Hampson in 1918.

References

Agaristinae
Noctuoidea genera
Monotypic moth genera